Lago di Trebecco is a lake in the provinces of Piacenza (Emilia-Romagna and Pavia (Lombardy), Italy.

Lakes of Emilia-Romagna
Lakes of Lombardy